Marjoribanks North (17 November 1865 – 27 March 1949) was a Guyanese cricketer. He played in seven first-class matches for British Guiana from 1894 to 1897.

See also
 List of Guyanese representative cricketers

References

External links
 

1865 births
1949 deaths
Guyanese cricketers
Guyana cricketers